Salt is a village in the Borough of Stafford in Staffordshire, England. It is three miles northeast of Stafford situated half a mile southwest of the A51 trunk road and lying on elevated ground above the western side of the Trent valley. Population details as taken under the 2011 census are found under Seighford.  The village has an ancient public house with a thatched roof, The Hollybush Inn, dating from the 17th century, reputedly much older, and a village hall.

The village church is dedicated to St James the Great and was built on land donated by the Earl of Shrewsbury and largely paid for by him. It has a large circular stained glass east window, an unusually tall south porch and an open stone bell turret mounted at the east end of the church hung with two bells. The impressive wood rood screen was designed by Augustus Pugin. The village lies less than a mile to the north of Hopton Heath, which was a significant battlefield (Battle of Hopton Heath) in the English Civil War where in 1643 Parliamentarian forces were defeated by Royalists under Spencer Compton, who died there.

See also
Listed buildings in Salt and Enson

External links

Salt & Enson Parish Council
British Towns and Villages Encyclopaedia of Great Britain - Salt and Enson Parish
The Hollybush Inn, Salt

Borough of Stafford
Villages in Staffordshire